The Black Swan Hotel is a traditional inn and hotel in Devizes, Wiltshire. Overlooking the Market Place on the A360 road, the inn was built in 1737. It is associated with the nearby Wadworth Brewery. The inn is reputedly haunted; a young woman in a long dress is said to wander the corridors and walk through the walls.

References

External links
Official site

Georgian architecture in Wiltshire
Hotel buildings completed in 1737
Hotels in Wiltshire
Pubs in Wiltshire
Devizes
Tourist attractions in Wiltshire
Grade II* listed buildings in Wiltshire
1737 establishments in England